Christopher Julian Clement Wright (born 14 July 1985) is an English cricketer. During his school years, he was a regular in Hampshire's youth teams, and played for the Liphook and Ripsley Cricket Club.

Wright made his first-class debut for Middlesex in 2004, as a right-handed batsman and a right-arm medium-fast bowler. He was born at Chipping Norton, Oxfordshire and is a product of the Middlesex Academy who has also represented Cambridge University Centre of Cricketing Excellence and the Tamil Union club.

In August 2007, he signed a two-year contract to play for Essex until the end of the 2009 season. In March 2009, this was extended until the end of the 2011 season. However, they allowed him to play for Warwickshire on loan in August 2011 who then made the move permanent.

Wright's career blossomed at his third club. In the 2012 season, Wright formed an impressive opening attack partnership with Keith Barker for Warwickshire, helping the side capture the County Championship. Wright took over 50 first-class wickets in the season. His success led him to a call up
to the England Lions cricket team, and a new four-year contract with Warwickshire. However, in 2013 he suffered a stress-fracture of his back which hampered his progress.
In July 2018 it was announced that he would make the move at the end of the season to Leicestershire, as first-team opportunities at Warwickshire
had become scarce.

In September 2021, during the 2021 County Championship, Wright took his 500th first-class wicket.

References

External links
 

1985 births
Living people
English cricketers
Middlesex cricketers
Essex cricketers
People from Chipping Norton
Hampshire Cricket Board cricketers
Tamil Union Cricket and Athletic Club cricketers
Warwickshire cricketers
Leicestershire cricketers
Cambridge MCCU cricketers
Marylebone Cricket Club cricketers